Anne Davis Basting, is an American gerontologist working as a professor of English at the University of Wisconsin-Milwaukee's Peck School of the Arts. Her work centers around aging, memory and dementia, both from the point of view of the elderly and that of society; and of the uses of theater, storytelling and other arts in eldercare. She is one of the 2016 MacArthur Fellows (recipients of the $625,000 so-called "genius grants").

Life 
She graduated from Colorado College,  the University of Wisconsin–Madison, and the University of Minnesota.

Publications

Books 

 The arts and dementia care: A resource guide, New York: National Center for Creative Aging, 2003, 

 TimeSlips Creativity Journal. UWM Center on Age & Community, 2004,

Journals 
Basting, A. D. (2001) "God is a talking horse: Performance of self in dementia". The Drama Review 45(3): 78–94. 
Basting, A. D. (2003) "Looking back from loss: Performing the ‘self' in Alzheimer’s disease". Journal of Aging Studies 17(1): 87–99. 
Basting, A. D. (2006) "The arts and dementia care". Generations 30(1): 16–20. 
De Medeiros, K., and A. D. Basting (2013) "Shall I compare thee to a dose of Donepezil?: Cultural arts interventions in dementia care research".The Gerontologist 54(3): 344–353. 
McFadden S., and A. D. Basting (2010) "Healthy aging persons and their brains: Promoting resilience through creative engagement". Clinics in Geriatric Medicine 26(1): 149–161.

References

External links 
Basting's professional website
Theater Artist Anne Basting Named MacArthur Fellow, NPR September 22, 2016
Video and brief biography of Basting at MacArthur Foundation website
Anne Basting named UWM’s first MacArthur ‘genius’, University of Wisconsin-Milwaukee. Howie Magner, September 22, 2016

1960s births
Living people
University of Minnesota alumni
University of Wisconsin–Madison alumni
University of Wisconsin–Milwaukee faculty
American women academics
MacArthur Fellows
American gerontologists
Writers from Wisconsin
21st-century American women
Ashoka USA Fellows